Malé Březno is a municipality and village in Most District in the Ústí nad Labem Region of the Czech Republic. It has about 200 inhabitants.

Administrative parts
The village of Vysoké Březno is an administrative part of Malé Březno.

References

Villages in Most District